Mark Shipman (born 3 January 1973, in Leeds, West Yorkshire, England) is a male retired British diver. Mark attended Guiseley School. He is divorced with 2 teenage girls. Aeryn Anna Shipman and Anaïs Kirsten Shipman. Mark currently lives in South Africa and travels to the UK frequently.

Swimming career
Shipman has competed at European, World and Olympic levels on the 3 metre springboard. With Tony Ally he came 7th in the 2000 Olympics in Sydney.

He competed at four consecutive Commonwealth Games, which culminated in winning a silver medal in the 3 metres springboard synchronised event, at the 2006 Commonwealth Games for England.

His club is City of Sheffield although he started diving with Bradford Esprit under the tutelage of Tom Daley's coach Andy Banks.

References

English divers
Olympic divers of Great Britain
Divers at the 1994 Commonwealth Games
Divers at the 2000 Summer Olympics
Divers at the 2004 Summer Olympics
Sportspeople from Sheffield
1973 births
Living people
Commonwealth Games medallists in diving
Commonwealth Games silver medallists for England
Medallists at the 2006 Commonwealth Games